53 Arietis (abbreviated 53 Ari) is a variable star in the northern constellation of Aries. 53 Arietis is the Flamsteed designation; it also bears the variable star designation UW Arietis. It is a B-type main sequence star with a stellar classification of B1.5 V and mean apparent magnitude of 6.10, which is near the lower limit for naked eye visibility.

53 Arietis is a Beta Cephei variable.  It is a runaway star with a peculiar velocity of 48.1 km/s relative to its neighbors. The star was ejected from the Orion nebula some 4–5 million years ago, possibly when an orbiting companion exploded as a supernova.

References

External links
  
 HR 938
 Image 53 Arietis

019374
014514
Aries (constellation)
Arietis, UW
Runaway stars
Beta Cephei variables
B-type main-sequence stars
Arietis, 53
0938
Durchmusterung objects
TIC objects